Leszczawa may refer to the following places in Poland:

Leszczawa Dolna
Leszczawa Górna